The Nissan Almera Tino is a car which was produced by the Japanese automaker Nissan between 1998 and 2006 in Japan, as the Nissan Tino. Nissan's Spanish factory produced the Almera Tino between 2000 and 2006. It has been described as a mini MPV, a compact people carrier, or an estate car.

History 
The Almera Tino was based on floorpan of the Almera small family car (whose second generation had been launched at the beginning of 2000), and launched in Europe in July of that year, and was sold until the end of 2006, ceasing production in the February of that year, just before the Almera hatchback and saloon were axed. The car was known as simply Tino in Japan, and was sold from 1998 to 2006.

The television advertisements for the Almera Tino in Japan featured Mr. Bean, a character played by Rowan Atkinson.

Engines 
In the Tino range, there were four powertrains available:
 1.769L QG18DE 88kW / 90kW petrol with 4speed automatic transmission
 1.769L QG18DE 74kW petrol and EM29 17kW electric motor (hybrid) with CVT automatic transmission
 2.0L SR20DE 99kW petrol with CVT automatic transmission
 2.2L diesel

Equipment 
Like most models from Nissan, the Tino was credited for its equipment levels, and even basic models got climate control and front electric windows. Early JDM Tinos had a front bench seat with a sixth seat-belt with this later transitioning to two separate front seats. 

In January 2003, the Tino had a few updates, including a new steering wheel and new dials, whilst on the outside, the front indicators had clear plastic instead of orange, and the engines were revised.

References 

Almera
Euro NCAP small MPVs
Compact MPVs
Cars introduced in 1998
2000s cars

pl:Nissan Almera#Almera Tino